The Castle Mountains, highest point Elk Peak,  el. ,   are an island range east of White Sulphur Springs in Meagher County, Montana, United States. About 30,000 acres of the Castles were roadless as of 1995. The western portion of the Castles are moist, while the eastside is dry, porous limestone hills. The range gets its name from "castle turrets", 50-foot high igneous rock spires on the western slopes. The range was the focus of mining activity in the previous century; crumbling remains of old miners' cabins and diggings are present throughout the area. The landscape is characterized by a central cluster of peaks over 8,000 feet and extensive grassy parks surrounded by lodgepole pine and limber pine. The Castles are lightly used by recreationists except for hunters in the fall. On the peak of Castle Mountain itself is a login book for the few who reach the top. There is no trail that leads to the peak.

See also
 List of mountain ranges in Montana

Notes

Mountain ranges of Montana
Landforms of Meagher County, Montana
Lewis and Clark National Forest